Rough Night in Jericho is a 1967 American Western film in Techniscope, directed by Arnold Laven and starring  Dean Martin, George Peppard and Jean Simmons. The picture was based on the novel The Man in Black, written in 1965 by Marvin H. Albert, who also co-wrote the screenplay. The supporting cast includes John McIntire and Slim Pickens. Rough Night in Jericho is the only film in which Dean Martin portrayed the villain.

Plot
A stagecoach bound for the town of Jericho is ambushed by Alex Flood, a lawman gone bad. Sharpshooting from a safe distance, Flood wounds the coach's driver, Ben Hickman, who is brought to town by the only passenger, a gambler named Dolan.

Hickman is a former Santa Fe lawman and Dolan was once his deputy. They now are partners in the stage line with Molly Lang, whom they have come to Jericho to meet. She was once Flood's lover when he came to Jericho to restore law and order, but now she hates the man who has seized power in the town.

Flood forms a lynch mob that hangs a man who dared confront one of his gang, then dynamites  the home of general store owner Ryan, another townsman who tried to organize a secret meeting. While the wounded Hickman recovers from the gunshot, Dolan takes a liking to Molly and decides to help her when Flood's men try to take over her stagecoach line. He gets into a violent fight with Yarbrough, one of Flood's men.

Dolan begins to create havoc in Flood's empire, stealing his cattle and causing explosions at Flood's ranch house, mill and gold mine. He is assisted by Hickman, Molly, Ryan and by Jace, the town's former deputy. Flood returns to Jericho seeking revenge. He shoots Hickman in the back, killing him. Dolan sets out after Flood for a final showdown in the hills. After Flood shoots Dolan in the arm, Dolan manages to throw his knife at Flood and kill him.

Cast
 Dean Martin as Alex Flood
 George Peppard as Dolan
 Jean Simmons as Molly Lang
 John McIntire as Ben Hickman
 Slim Pickens as Yarbrough
 Don Galloway as Jace
 Brad Weston as Torrey
 Richard O'Brien as Frank Ryan
 Carol Andreson as Claire
 Steve Sandor as Simms
 Warren Vanders as Harvey
 John Napier as McGivern

Production
Parts of the film were shot in Glen Canyon, Kanab Canyon, Paria and the Gap in Utah.

References

External links
 
 
 
 
 

1967 films
1967 Western (genre) films
American Western (genre) films
1960s English-language films
Films based on American novels
Films based on Western (genre) novels
Films directed by Arnold Laven
Films scored by Don Costa
Universal Pictures films
Revisionist Western (genre) films
1960s American films